Bayu Ayele (born 4 April 1949) is an Ethiopian boxer. He competed in the men's lightweight event at the 1968 Summer Olympics. In his opening fight at the 1968 Summer Olympics, he lost to Stoiane Pilitchev of Bulgaria.

References

1949 births
Living people
Ethiopian male boxers
Olympic boxers of Ethiopia
Boxers at the 1968 Summer Olympics
Sportspeople from Addis Ababa
Lightweight boxers